Max Nemni is a Canadian political scientist and writer, best known for a series of biographies of former Prime Minister of Canada Pierre Trudeau which he cowrote with his wife Monique Nemni.

He is a retired professor of political science at Université Laval, and a former coeditor of Cité Libre.

The first volume of the Trudeau biography, Young Trudeau: Son of Quebec, Father of Canada, 1919-1944, won the Shaughnessy Cohen Prize for Political Writing in 2006. The second volume, Trudeau Transformed: The Shaping of a Statesman, 1944-1965, was a shortlisted nominee for the same award in 2011. A third volume, focusing on Trudeau's career in elected politics after 1965, is slated for future publication.

Works
Young Trudeau: Son of Quebec, Father of Canada, 1919-1944 (2006)
Trudeau Transformed: The Shaping of a Statesman, 1944-1965 (2011)

References

Canadian political scientists
Canadian magazine editors
Canadian biographers
Canadian male non-fiction writers
Male biographers
Canadian non-fiction writers in French
Writers from Montreal
Academic staff of Université Laval
Living people
Year of birth missing (living people)